Tabo is a small town in the Lahaul and Spiti district on the banks of the Spiti River in Himachal Pradesh, India. The town lies on the road between Rekong Peo and Kaza (alternative spelling: Kaja), the sub-divisional headquarters of Spiti.  The town surrounds a Buddhist monastery which, according to legend, is said to be over a thousand years old.  The Dalai Lama has expressed his desire to retire to Tabo, since he maintains that the  Tabo Monastery is one of the holiest. In 1996, the Dalai Lama conducted the Kalachakra initiation ceremony in Tabo, which coincided with the millennium anniversary celebrations of the Tabo monastery. The ceremony was attended by thousands of Buddhists from across the world.  Tabo Monastery's spiritual head is Tsenshap Serkong Rinpoche.

Geography and climate
The village is situated at an altitude of 10,760 ft/ 3,280 metres. Climate in Tabo is very unpredictable as it ranges from cloudy to sunny and from snow to heavy snowfall. Summers are short from May to August and winters are longer from mid-September to April.

Places of interest

The temples within the monastery complex in Tabo have a plethora of wall paintings and mud statues. The Archaeological Survey of India (ASI) attempted to restore some paintings that were ravaged by time, but were not very successful. Photography, however, is not permitted inside the monastery. Near the monastery there is a souvenir shop.

Tourism
There are a few hotels in Tabo, of which the Banjara Camps retreat is the most luxurious. The temperatures here plummet at night. There are other hotels and hostels like Dekit Norphel Tiger Den Restaurant, Tashi Gangsar, Menthok Dumra at Tabo, including the monastery's own guest houses.

Transport
Mobile phone networks do not work well in Tabo in Spiti Valley, except BSNL & Jio network.

Tabo is connected to other major towns like Kaza and Kalpa with Himachal Pradesh Road Transport Network.

Notes

References
Deepak Sanan & Dhanu Swadi. 2002. Exploring Kinnaur & Spiti in the Trans-Himalaya. 2nd edition.  Indus Publishing Co., New Delhi. , pp. 147–153

External links 
 Tabo monastery
 Practical Info about Tabo on the Net

Cities and towns in Lahaul and Spiti district
Caves of Himachal Pradesh
Geography of Lahaul and Spiti district